Hooverdam is the seventh studio album by Hugh Cornwell, released in June 2008 by Invisible Hands Music, initially as a free digital download with a compact disc and vinyl version released later. A short movie entitled "Blueprint" chronicling the recording of the album had a limited release in cinemas in the UK and was released on a DVD which came with the CD. Some tracks, like "Philip K. Ridiculous" and "Delightful Nightmare," echo the heavy bass lines previously present in early Stranglers records.

The night after playing in Phoenix in his North America tour during March and August, Cornwell  visited the Hoover Dam and recorded a video message there for his fans. He claims he gave the album its name because the Hoover Dam is a huge feat in human engineering and a monument to mankind. He thinks that Alfred Hitchcock should have made a film set at the Hoover Dam.

The album was cited as being one of his best yet with mainly favourable reviews. These reviews resulted in Cornwell being asked to play at certain American venues he had not played in since leaving The Stranglers.

Critical reception

Rick Anderson, writing for AllMusic, called it a "very fine album," consisting of "scrappy, pared-down, punk-inflected power pop," with some songs evoking "the late '70s in an entirely salutary way." Michael Toland of The Big Takeover concurred, describing the album as "a straightforward melodic rock and roll affair," adding that there's "nothing trendy or modern about it, thank goodness." Cornwell and his band "simply knock out one catchy rock/pop gem after another." Toland felt that Hooverdam "contains some of the best work of Cornwell's long and illustrious career."

Joe Shooman of Record Collector wrote, "the pace rarely lets up on an LP that, in part due to its back-to-basics rock'n'roll aesthetic, makes it something of a cousin to the likes of Lou Reed's storming 1988 LP, New York." Shooman remarked: "a very coherent album with rather a timeless quality." Jason Toon of the Riverfront Times wrote, "Hooverdam's stripped-down, three-chord sound is rawer than anything Cornwell's done since well before he left the Stranglers in 1990."

Track listing

Blueprint DVD

Personnel
Credits adapted from the album liner notes.

Musicians
Hugh Cornwell - vocals, guitar
Chris Bell - drums, synthesizer (8)
Caroline 'Caz' Campbell - bass, vocals, piano (6, 9), synthesizer (8)
Additional musicians
Charles Kennedy - piano (9)
Damian Hand - saxophone (10)
Technical
Liam Watson - producer, engineer, mixing
Ed Turner - engineer, mixing
John Clube - artwork  
Phoenix - photography
DVD
Hugh Cornwell - director, editing, post production
Matt Tidmarsh - editing, post production
Paul Barker - editing, post production
Liam Watson - engineer, sound mixing
Ed Turner - engineer, sound mixing
Tom Grimshaw - camera
Chris Reynolds - camera
Jamie Goodbrand - camera
Marc Rovira - camera
Paul Green - film producer

References

2008 albums
Hugh Cornwell albums